The team dressage in equestrian at the 1936 Olympic Games in Berlin was held on the May Field on 12–13 August. The host German team won the gold medal. France won silver and Sweden took bronze.

Competition format
The team and individual dressage competitions used the same format: a series of moves was performed from memory by each rider within 17 minutes, losing half a point for every second over the time limit. There were 40 individual movements in each test. For each movement, each judge gave a score from 0 to 10; this score was multiplied by the movement's coefficient.

Results

References

Equestrian at the Summer Olympics